Jackson Fiulaua (born October 13, 1957 in Raiako, Malaita) is a Solomon Islands politician.

Biography
After a primary school education, Fiulaua began working as a builder. He was later described as "a successful businessman who runs one of the top local construction companies in the country".

He began his political career when he was elected MP for Central Kwara'ae in the August 2010 general election. His election was described as "the major upset" in the election, as he unseated incumbent deputy Prime Minister Fred Fono, who had held the seat for twelve years. Fiulaua's election also provoked "numerous debates" due to his reportedly being "unable to read and write". Elected as an independent, Fiulaua declined to join any political party, but did join Prime Minister Danny Philip's coalition government, as Minister for Infrastructure and Development. When Gordon Darcy Lilo replaced Philip as Prime Minister in November 2011, Fiulaua retained his position in government.

On 28 February 2012, Fiulaua was sacked from the government for what Lilo described as a lack of performance. Leader of the Opposition Dr. Derek Sikua described the sacking as "grossly unfair". On that occasion, Fiulaua's "limited educational background" was mentioned anew, and downplayed by his supporters.

References

1957 births
Living people
Members of the National Parliament of the Solomon Islands
People from Malaita Province
Government ministers of the Solomon Islands